The ghumot (East Indians: घुमट or ಘುಮೋಟ), gumot or ghumat is a membranophone instrument from [Goa], India. Ghumat is a percussion instrument of earthen vessel having both sides open; on the bigger opening a leather (drum membrane) of monitor lizard is mounted. Generally ghumat is accompanied by 'shamel', another traditional instrument with wooden drum and goat leather mount. This instrument is still very popular amongst by the East Indian people. In August 2019, Goa declared the ghumot as its heritage instrument.

Usage
Ghumat forms an integral part of Goan folk, religious and temple music, both Hindu and Christian. It serves as an accompaniment to the folk songs and to the mando music. But most importantly it plays a vital role in the music played in Goa during the Ganesh festival. It also used in most of the Goan temples during the spring season in an orchestra called as Suvari Vadan.

Khaprumama Parvatkar was one well known artist of this instrument.

Other states

This percussion instrument is also played to accompany folk songs in some areas of Karnataka.

In Andhra Pradesh, this drum is known as gummeta, and it is played in the storytelling folk tradition.

References

External links and videos
 Suvari vadan at Ramanath temple in Goa
Ghumot in Karnataka

Membranophones
Indian musical instruments
Traditional Goan musical instruments